Wollert Konow (16 August 1845  – 15 March 1924) was the 12th prime minister of Norway from 1910 to 1912.  He was the leader of a coalition cabinet. Konow's time as Prime Minister saw the extension of accident insurance to seamen in 1911.

Background
Konow was born in the borough of Fana in the city of Bergen, Norway. He was the son of Wollert Konow (1809–1881) and  Marie Louise Oehlenschläger (1818–1910). His father was a  writer and elected official. In 1842 his parents had purchased the historic Stend Manor in Fana where Wollert Konow was born. 
Wollert Konow was a grandson of the noted  Danish  poet and playwright Adam Oehlenschlager (1779–1850).

He was a student at Bergen Cathedral School. After graduating in 1864, Konow went to the  Royal Frederick University in  Christiania. He  began to  study law   which he never completed. In 1868,  he started  a school at Halsnøy in Sunnhordland where he was both teacher and head manager until 1872. In 1873 Konow took over operation of the mill at Stend and expanded the estate by acquiring neighboring properties.

Career
Wollert Konow was mayor of Fana most of the time between 1880 and 1901, and was in 1877–1879 Deputy to the Parliament for Søndre Bergenhus amt (now Hordaland). He served as Minister of Agriculture in 1910 and Minister of Auditing 1910-1912. He was Odelsting president 1884–1887 and President of the Storting in 1888 and again from 1897 to 1899. He was a central board member of the Liberal Left Party from 1909 to 1912. Wollert Konow served as Prime Minister over a two-year period as leader of a coalition which combined elements of two competing parties; Høgre and Frisindede Venstre. Konow's coalition government came to an end in 1912 after he declared his sympathies for the rural language form Landsmål during the height of the Norwegian language conflict  causing conflict with  Riksmål supporters.
After loss in the election in 1912, Konow was out of politics for good, and he spent the remainder of his life at Stend.

He was commonly referred to as  Wollert Konow (SB) to differentiate him from Wollert Konow (H) who was his cousin and contemporary politician from Hedemark.  The initials "SB" stood for "Søndre Bergenhus," the now-defunct constituency Konow represented in national politics.

Personal life
In 1875, he married Fredrikke Wilhelmine Kooter (1854-1935),  who was the daughter of Jacob Blaauw Kooter (1818-1887) and Marie Frederikke Balchen (1817-1883).
Konow was alternate member of the Norwegian Nobel Committee,  1913 to 1922 and Member of the Committee from 1922 until he died at Stend in Fana during 1924.

Stend Manor
Stend Manor (Stend hovedgård) was a historic estate which had  belonged to  Nonneseter Abbey of Bergen during the Middle Ages. 
Around 1682, the main building was built in timber as a single-story  with  three wings.
In 1842, Dr. Wollert Konow acquired Stend.
In 1861, Stend was bought by Søndre Bergenhus (now Hordaland) county.
Since then, it has housed an agricultural school.
Under the direction of architect Erlend Tryti (1885-1962) extensive renovation and restoration work was carried out in the years 1921-1922.
The main building were   restored in the late 1980s and early 1990s.

See also
Konow's Cabinet

References

Other sources
Garvik, Olav (2001) Wollert Konow, Statsminister og stril (Bergen: Fagbokforlaget)

Related reading
Borgen, Per Otto (1999) Norges statsministre (Oslo: Aschehou)   
Forr, Gudleiv; Hegge, Per Egil; Njølstad, Olav (2010) Mellom plikt og lyst. Norske statsministre 1873–2010 (Oslo: Dinamo) 
Kaartvedt, Alf (1984) Drømmen om borgerlig samling 1884–1918 (Oslo: Cappelen) 

1845 births
1924 deaths
Politicians from Bergen
People educated at the Bergen Cathedral School
University of Oslo alumni
Presidents of the Storting
Liberal Party (Norway) politicians
Free-minded Liberal Party politicians
20th-century Norwegian politicians
Government ministers of Norway
Ministers of Agriculture and Food of Norway
Prime Ministers of Norway